Münchener Bier   is a beer from Germany that is protected under EU law with PGI status, first published under relevant laws in 1998. This designation was one of six German beers registered with the PGI designation at the time.

Production description

The beer is produced using water taken from deep wells within the city of Munich, which is drawn through layers of slate formed millions of years ago. The water is mixed with coarsely ground malted cereal; this produces a “mash” that is stirred constantly while being heated to different temperature levels. The process of heating activates enzymes in the malt, making its components readily soluble. The mixture is then “lautered” (which involves filtering the wort and removing insoluble materials), then adding hops and boiling the mixture for one to two hours. This helps create the specific flavor profile of the beer, breaking down the hops and removing proteins that are detrimental to the taste.

The still-hot wort (free of solids) is then taken to fermentation vessels where yeast is added. The yeast used is derived from a single cell, ensuring consistent properties from one batch to the next. Fermentation takes place over the next four to eight days. The sugars in the resulting mixture are converted into alcohol and carbon dioxide (each about a third of the mixture) with unfermented malt accounting for the remainder.

Once this initial fermentation is complete, the remaining yeast is removed and the beer is placed into secondary fermentation tanks. Over the next four to eleven weeks, this secondary fermentation gradually matures the beer and it is then ready to be bottled or put into kegs.  The entire beer-making process must take place within the city of Munich.

Descriptions
In 2013, further clarifications were provided, describing several beers covered under the PGI designation: Non-alcoholic Weißbier, Helles, Export Helles, Leichtes Weißbier, Export Dunkel, Pils, Kristall Weizen, Hefeweizen Hell, Hefeweizen Dunkel, Märzen, Bockbier, Doppelbock, Leichtbier, Diät Pils, Schwarz-Bier, ICE-Bier, Nähr-/Malzbier and Oktoberfestbier.

"Consumers associate a special reputation and expectations of the highest quality with beer produced in Munich. This quality is based not only on observance of the Munich Purity Law of 1487, which was passed 29 years before the equivalent Bavarian Law of 1516, but in particular on the fact that the Munich breweries obtain their brewing water from deep wells in the gravel plain of the city. These wells, which reach down to strata from the tertiary period, are as deep as 250 m in places. (…)The population's strong attachment to ‘Münchener Bier’ and its associated reputation derive, in the Munich area, from the long tradition of beer production in Munich and the historical associations. As a result of its healthy growth ‘Münchner Bier’ achieved first local, then regional, then national and finally international renown. (…)The renown and reputation of ‘Münchner Bier’ have, as we have seen, grown continuously in Germany and other EU Member States over the last 550 years."

References

Beer in Germany
German products with protected designation of origin